Wartenau is a through station on the Hamburg U-Bahn line U1. The station was opened in October 1961 and is located in the Hamburg district of Eilbek, Germany. Eilbek is part of the Hamburg borough of Wandsbek.

Service

Trains 
Wartenau is served by Hamburg U-Bahn line U1; departures are every 5 minutes.

See also 

 List of Hamburg U-Bahn stations

References

External links 

 Line and route network plans at hvv.de 

Hamburg U-Bahn stations in Hamburg
Buildings and structures in Wandsbek
U1 (Hamburg U-Bahn) stations
Railway stations in Germany opened in 1961
1961 establishments in West Germany